Farm Hands is a 1943 Our Gang short comedy film directed by Herbert Glazer. It was the 215th Our Gang short (216th episode, 127th talking short, 128th talking episode, and 47th MGM produced episode) that was released.

Plot
Moving out of their standard small-town surroundings, the gang visits the farm owned by Mickey's uncle where  the youngsters attempt to milk a cow by placing two bottles under the udders and hoping that nature takes its course. The gang also feeds Mexican jumping beans to the chickens, are chased by an ornery mule, and end up stuck in a hay-baling machine.

Cast

The Gang
 Bobby Blake as Mickey
 Billy Laughlin as Froggy
 Billie Thomas as Buckwheat
 Mickey Laughlin as Happy

Additional cast
 Murray Alper as Bill, Mickey's father

Reception
This film was criticized by The New York Times, riddled with misfired directing and unconvincing performers. If the film had some of the past gangers like Spanky, Alfalfa, Stymie and Wheezer, it may have been a better film.

See also
 Our Gang filmography

References

External links

1943 films
American black-and-white films
Films directed by Herbert Glazer
Metro-Goldwyn-Mayer short films
1943 comedy films
Our Gang films
1943 short films
Films about agriculture
1940s American films